Henrik Ipsen (born 30 June 1973) is a Danish professional football goalkeeper and later a goalkeeper coach.

References

External links
 FC Midtjylland profile

Living people
1973 births
Danish men's footballers
Silkeborg IF players
SønderjyskE Fodbold players
Vejle Boldklub players
Association football goalkeepers
FC Nordsjælland non-playing staff